The 1922 United States Senate special election in Pennsylvania was held on November 7, 1922. Incumbent Republican Senator George Pepper, who had been appointed to the seat by Governor William Sproul following the death of Boies Penrose, was elected to fill the remaining four years on the term to which Penrose had been elected in 1920. Pepper comfortably defeated five other candidates, including Democratic nominee Fred Kerr of Clearfield County.

Background
Incumbent Senator Boies Penrose, who had been elected in 1920 for a term expiring in 1927, died on December 31, 1921. Governor of Pennsylvania William Cameron Sproul appointed George W. Pepper to fill Penrose's seat until a successor could be duly elected. The special election for the remainder of Penrose's term was scheduled for November 7, simultaneous with the general election.

Primary elections were held on May 16. Pepper was a candidate to complete the term.

Republican primary

Candidates
William J. Burke, U.S. Representative from Pittsburgh (representing Pennsylvania at-large)
George W. Pepper, former University of Pennsylvania Law School professor and interim U.S. Senator
Edward R. Wood, retired Philadelphia businessman

Results

After losing the Republican primary, Burke campaigned as the Progressive nominee in the regularly scheduled election for Pennsylvania's other U.S. Senate seat.

General election

Candidates
Fred Kerr, Clearfield businessman and U.S. Army veteran (Democratic)
Frank Lewis (Prohibition)
George Wharton Pepper, former University of Pennsylvania Law School professor and interim U.S. Senator (Republican)
James Robinson (Single Tax)
Earl Thompson (Progressive)
William Van Essen (Socialist)

Results

References

Pennsylvania special
1922 special
Pennsylvania 1922 special
United States Senate 1922 special
United States Senate special
Pennsylvania 1922